The 1893 Invercargill mayoral election was held on 29 November 1893 as part of that year's local elections.

Incumbent mayor Duncan McFarlane was defeated, coming third behind Andrew Raeside and former unofficial mayor Aaron Blacke.

Results
The following table gives the election results:

References

1893 elections in New Zealand
Mayoral elections in Invercargill